Swolnpes is a genus of spiders in the family Anamidae. It was first described in 2009 by Main & Framenau. , it contains 2 Australian species.

References

Anamidae
Mygalomorphae genera
Spiders of Australia